The 1869 Wexford Borough by-election was held on 26 February 1869.  The by-election was held because the election of the incumbent Liberal MP, Richard Joseph Devereux had been declared void. It was retained by Devereux who was unopposed.

References

By-elections to the Parliament of the United Kingdom in County Wexford constituencies
1869 elections in the United Kingdom
Unopposed by-elections to the Parliament of the United Kingdom (need citation)
February 1869 events
1869 elections in Ireland